"City of Stars" is a song performed by Ryan Gosling and Emma Stone in the film La La Land (2016). The music of the song was composed by Justin Hurwitz while the lyrics were provided by Benj Pasek and Justin Paul. The song won numerous awards, including the award for Best Original Song at both the 74th Golden Globe Awards and 89th Academy Awards.

Context
In the film, the song is first sung by Gosling alone as the character of Sebastian as he sings and dances on the Hermosa Beach Pier. Later in the film, it is reprised by Sebastian and Mia (Stone) during a montage of him getting ready to tour with Keith's (John Legend) band, as well as Mia quitting her job at a coffee shop and renting out a theater for her one-woman play.

Inspiration
Justin Hurwitz, the composer of the song, discussed the writing of the song:

In popular culture

Cover versions
 On The Voice of Greece, Stefanos Vezirgianopoulos & Kiriaki Sahinidou covered this song on the third Battle episode of the show on 14 November 2018.
 On The Voice UK, Shane McCormack covered this song on the second Knockout Show on 24 March 2018.
 On The X Factor UK, Lloyd Macey covered this song on the first Live Show on 28 October 2017.
 Sheridan Smith covered this song on her debut album Sheridan.
 Anton du Beke and Connie Fisher covered this song on Anton's debut album From the Top.
 Gavin James covered this song and released it as a single.
 South Korean singer Hwasa from Mamamoo covered this song and released it on YouTube.
 Qian Zhenghao covered this song on the Chinese idol survival show Idol Producer.
 Singers Eile Monty and Black Gryph0n covered this song and released it on YouTube.
 On Operación Triunfo 2017, Amaia Romero and Alfred García covered this song on the Gala 3 on 13 November 2017.
 On the seventh season of Singer, Liu Huan and its guest singer Tia Ray covered this song on the Finals Rush Hour on April 5, 2019.
 On the episode 9 of Sea of Hope, South Korean actor Lee Dong-wook and South Korean singer Lee Su-hyun covered this song.
 On the 2021 MBC Gayo Daejejeon, ITZY's Lia and Stray Kids' Bangchan and Felix, covered this song.

Music video 
The music video was uploaded to YouTube channel on Apr 17, 2017 and has gained more than 11 Million views as of October 2021.

Accolades

Charts

Weekly charts

Year-end charts

Certifications

See also 
 Another Day of Sun
 Audition (The Fools Who Dream)
 La La Land

References

2016 songs
Best Original Song Academy Award-winning songs
Best Original Song Golden Globe winning songs
Songs about Los Angeles
Songs written by Justin Paul (songwriter)
Songs written by Benj Pasek
Songs with music by Justin Hurwitz
Songs from La La Land

ja:シティ・オブ・スターズ